Kimiko Gelman (born February 20, 1966) is an American actress.

Gelman is best known for starring in the television series Rags to Riches from 1987 to 1988, where she played the role of Rose. She has also made appearances on a number of other TV shows including CSI: Miami, Providence, The West Wing, Beverly Hills 90210 and Chicago Hope. She appeared in the movie The Hunger Games as Venia, a member of Katniss Everdeen's prep team. Gelman has also acted in various theater productions in the United States.

Kimiko is the granddaughter of the American artist Aaron Gelman.

Filmography

References

External links 

 

American television actresses
American stage actresses
Living people
1966 births
Place of birth missing (living people)
21st-century American actresses
20th-century American actresses
American film actresses
Jewish American actresses
American people of Belarusian-Jewish descent
21st-century American Jews
20th-century American Jews